Seven Lives Many Faces is the seventh studio album by the German musical project Enigma, released on 19 September 2008 by Virgin Records. Michael Cretu stated that the album would feature an omnicultural sound unlike anything on its previous releases. On 12 September, the album was released on Enigma's Myspace page for pre-listening. After enjoying a huge success on MySpace (with over 400,000 listens in two days), several international MTV and VH1 websites started streaming the album until 22 September.

Seven Lives Many Faces was also released in DVD format with 5.1 surround sound, similar to their previous album A Posteriori.

Singles
The first two singles from the album are "Seven Lives" and "La Puerta del Cielo". The videos for each song use scenes from previous Enigma videos, "Push the Limits" for "Seven Lives" and "Age of Loneliness" for "La Puerta del Cielo". "The Same Parents" was released as the third single off the album. The lyrics of the song "La Puerta del Cielo" (The Gate of Heaven), although with a Spanish title, are in Catalan language. The other song of the album written in Catalan is "Between Generations". Both songs were co-written by Michael Cretu and Margalida Roig.

Critical reception

AllMusic's James Christopher Monger gave the album three stars out of five. While he praised the singles "Seven Lives" and "La Puerta del Cielo" calling them "quietly stunning", he found that in most cases "the new age, fortune-cookie derived lyrics... mirror the unimaginative, two-chord melodies that carry them along."

Commercial performance
The album debuted at No. 92 on the Billboard 200, and No. 1 on the New Age Albums, selling 6,000 copies in the first week.  The album had sold 85,000 copies in the United States as of September 2016.

Track listing

Bonus disc

Credits
Michael Cretu – music, lyrics, performance, production, programming, arrangements, engineering
Andru Donalds – vocals (tracks: 2, 4, 8, 9), co-writer (tracks: 8, 9)
Nanuk – vocals (track: 4), narration (track: 9) 
Nikita C. – vocals (track: 4) 
Sebastian C. – vocals (track: 4) 
Margarita Roig – vocals (tracks: 7, 11, 2 (Bonus CD)), co-writer (tracks: 7, 11)
Ruth-Ann Boyle – vocals (tracks 3, 5, 2 (Bonus CD))

Additional personnel
Photography – Rosemary Robenn
Artwork – Dirk Rudolph

Charts

Weekly charts

Year-end charts

Certifications

Release history

References

2008 albums
Enigma (German band) albums
Virgin Records albums